Micropholis spectabilis is a species of plant in the family Sapotaceae. It is endemic to Venezuela.

References

spectabilis
Endemic flora of Venezuela
Vulnerable plants
Taxonomy articles created by Polbot